Family II can refer to:
 Family II engine, a straight-4 Opel-designed engine from the 1970s debuting in 1979
 Ii clan (井伊氏), a Japanese family of samurai
 Family 2 (film), a 2001 film by Takashi Miike

See also
 Family (disambiguation)
 Ii (disambiguation)